The streaked wren-babbler (Gypsophila brevicaudata) is a species of bird in the family Pellorneidae.
It is found in Bangladesh, Cambodia, China, India, Laos, Malaysia, Myanmar, Thailand and Vietnam.
Its natural habitats are subtropical or tropical moist lowland forest and subtropical or tropical moist montane forest.

References

Collar, N. J. & Robson, C. 2007. Family Timaliidae (Babblers)  pp. 70 – 291 in; del Hoyo, J., Elliott, A. & Christie, D.A. eds. Handbook of the Birds of the World, Vol. 12. Picathartes to Tits and Chickadees. Lynx Edicions, Barcelona.
Rahman, M. M., Ahsan, M. F., & Haider, I. K. A. 2017. A first record of the Streaked Wren Babbler Napothera brevicaudata from Bangladesh. Indian BIRDS 12 (6): 167-168

streaked wren-babbler
Birds of Northeast India
Birds of Indochina
streaked wren-babbler
streaked wren-babbler
Taxonomy articles created by Polbot
Taxobox binomials not recognized by IUCN